John Henry Douglas (January 12, 1945 – September 25, 2011) was an American football defensive back who played two seasons with the New Orleans Saints of the National Football League. He was drafted by the New Orleans Saints in the fifth round of the 1967 NFL Draft. He played college football at Texas Southern University and attended Como in Fort Worth, Texas. Douglas was also a member of the Houston Oilers of the American Football League.

References

External links
Just Sports Stats

1945 births
2005 deaths
Players of American football from Fort Worth, Texas
American football defensive backs
African-American players of American football
Texas Southern Tigers football players
New Orleans Saints players
Houston Oilers players
20th-century African-American sportspeople
21st-century African-American people